The Human Boundaries is a documentary film on the life of Hindu refugees from Pakistan.

Synopsis

A group of 152 Pakistani Hindus entered India on September, 2011 with a one-month tourist visa. They came to take refugees from the various religious persecutions they had to face in Pakistan. The group which has a majority of children and women are now sheltered in a camp on the outskirts of New Delhi. But now their visa has expired and is facing deportation. Various organizations are fighting for the basic human rights of these people at the political and judicial level. Their story is a grim reminder of all those lives caught up in no man's land. As more boundaries are drawn across the human conscience, we failed to realize that humanity has always suffered. The film was shot in a highly restricted and sensitive environment inside the refugee camp in a short span of 3 days with the use of minimal filming equipment. This documentary traces the difficulties they had to face in Pakistan, their life inside the camp and their hopes for tomorrow.

Screenings and recognitions 
The film which has been certified with a "U/V" certificate by the censor board. The film has a distribution contract from a US Company called Commodity Films for worldwide distribution through online and offline media. The documentary has created a strong news buzz and has been screened in different parts of the country after its premiere in the Delhi University.

 The film went on a national film tour across the United States, with screenings in 12 different cities. During the film tour the film made its presence in the US Capitol, Offices of Senators and Congressmen, Office of USCIRF and Human Rights Commission, US State Department, universities, media, public libraries, community centers etc.
 The film is scheduled to tour Europe in 2013, with screenings in 12 major cities. The film will also be screened in some of the major universities across UK during this European tour.
 Won the first runner-up for "Best Documentary" in Cinematheque 2012, a film festival conducted by the prestigious St. Xavier's College in association with the Xavierian Film Academy in Kolkata.
 Screened at the International Human Rights Conference in New Delhi.
 The film has been screened in more than 10 major cities across India and these screenings were attended by many distinguished film makers & social activists.

References

External links
 IMDb Page
 A Passion That Broke Boundaries
 Dissolving Human Boundaries

2012 films